Val Air Inc was an airline based in Quebec City Canada that was founded by Gilles Filiatreault, a former CEO of the Caribbean carriers LIAT and BWIA.

History
On December 9, 2003 the Canadian Transportation Agency issued a license for the carrier to operate domestic services with small aircraft. On February 24, 2004 the CTA suspended the airline's operating license as the certificate of insurance on file with the Agency had been canceled.

Code data
IATA Code: VK

Fleet
The Val Air fleet comprised a single DHC Dash 8-100 aircraft.

See also 
 List of defunct airlines of Canada

External links
Canadian Transportation Agency: December 9, 2003
Canadian Transportation Agency: February 24, 2004
Internet Archive; Wayback Machine

Defunct airlines of Canada
Airlines established in 2003
Airlines disestablished in 2004